is a Japanese light novel series written by Natsuya Semikawa and illustrated by Kururi. It began serialization online in 2012 on the user-generated novel publishing website Shōsetsuka ni Narō. It won the site's Ni Narō Con Taishō award before being acquired by Takarajimasha, who have published seven volumes since 2014 under their Kono Light Novel ga Sugoi! Bunko imprint. A manga adaptation with art by Virginia Nitōhei began serialization in Kadokawa Shoten's seinen manga magazine Young Ace from July 2015. It's been collected in 16 Japanese tankōbon volumes as of December 2022. Udon Entertainment announced during their panel at San Diego Comic-Con International that they have licensed the manga. As of March 15, 2022 volume 10  has been published in English. An original net animation adaptation by Sunrise premiered from April 13 to September 14, 2018.

Plot
Nobuyuki Yazawa owns a Kyoto izakaya, whilst Shinobu Senke serves customers. Three months prior to the series' start, Shinobu went to an Inari shrine and prays for the izakaya's success. Inari-sama responds by making the front door open into the old capital city of Aitheria in another world.

Characters

Izakaya Nobu

 Played by: Ryohei Otani
 The owner of Izakaya Nobu, who established the restaurant after he left his former employment and cooks for customers from the other world. He is referred to as "Taishō" by everyone. Over time, he starts integrating and incorporating other unfamiliar Western foods into the menu, like schnitzel and al ajillo, to expand on his field of cooking.

 Played by: Rena Takeda
 Izakaya Nobu's waitress. The daughter of Nobuyuki's former employer; she became a waitress for Izakaya Nobu after running away from an arranged marriage. Despite her cheerful attitude, she tends to act childish when Taishō makes fun of her; she can be very stern and serious when anyone disrespects Nobu.

 Played by: Yuzumi Shintani
 A dishwasher at Izakaya Nobu, who was hired after she tried to take a water faucet on a mistaken pretense. She is so far the only resident to cross into the "other world" (Japan) and speak to Byakko. She has two younger siblings, whom she brings food back home after completing her shift.

 Played by: Akane Hotta
 A waitress at Izakaya Nobu and Berthold's wife, who grew up in a fishing village; due to this, she's efficient at handling live seafood. Despite her kind nature, it's been hinted that she can be very fearsome if necessary. Being a daughter of a squid fisherman, she is quite strong for her size, with good wrist and grip. She's later left Nobu temporarily on her maternal leave.

Aitheria Guard

Played by: Yutaka Kobayashi
A junior Palace Guard in Aitheria, he is a regular patron after being introduced to the restaurant by Nikolaus. He is also a glassmaker, Lorentz's son. He wants to eventually leave the guards to pursue other interests, and usually goes to Taishō for advice. He also has a small crush on Shinobu. Later, he quits his guard position, and begins his culinary apprenticeship under Taishō's teachings.

Played by: Jin Shirasu
A Palace Guard in Aitheria, he introduced his fellow peers to the restaurant. Despite being known to be a womanizer, he is observant of those who come in and out of the kingdom.

Played by: Shinnosuke Abe
He is Captain of the palace guard; thus Hans and Nikolaus' superior. He is also Hermina's husband. After being introduced to Nobu by Hans, he instantly fell in love with Nobu's chicken dishes. Originally, he was fearful of seafood, specifically squid; before the stories, his great-grandfather told him about a giant squid encounter, and his fear of squid further escalated, when he fought an enemy knight with a squid emblem. It is revealed he was raised in the mountains, the exact opposite lifestyle to Hermina's.

Water Transportation Guild

Played by: Ryuhei Watabe
The leader of Water Dragon's Scale, Aitheria's largest guild. Out of the guild leaders, he is the most temperamental and feared by many of the customers. After learning about Nobu's cooking of eel and octopus, he falls in love with Taishō's cooking.

Played by: Arisa Yagi
The leader of Harpies Shanty along with her mother. Harpies Shanty is the richest and most influential guild in the kingdom. She chooses to be a single woman, as she is picky about choosing men; however, she's started to show feelings for Nikolaus. As per her sense of beauty inherited from her mother, she's taken a liking about Nobu's beautiful dishes and tablewares, especially with Reishu and fishes.

Played by: Yuuki Ogoe
The leader of Golden Willow's Boat, who recently inherited the company after his father died. His company, which was founded by his grandfather, is the longest-running guild in the kingdom; however, due to competition, the company begins to deteriorate, with many employees leaving for Water Dragon's Scale or Harpies Shanty. It is not until with the help of "Nobu", that useless fish like eel turn out to be edible. Now, the three guilds work together as a partnership instead of competition. He soon begins introducing Taishō to many weird catches such as octopus to see if the food is both edible and profitable.

The Craftsmans Guild

Played by: Tomoharu Shoji
A lead Glass Maker and Hans' father. He also acts as an intermediary between the Water Transport Guilds. His students provide "Nobu" with the bento boxes for the eel dishes.

A lead Blacksmith and a friendly rival of Lorentz. He usually keeps Taishō up to date of the news going on in the capital.

Nobles

Played by: Eisuke Sasai
 The Aiteria City Council Chairman who abuses his power; even with the combined efforts of the guilds, the church, and the town; they are powerless to stop him. He uses his power in attempts to buy off "Nobu" and attempt to get Nobuyuki and Shinobu arrested for breaking capital laws due to their alcohol being lager; unaware its technically NOT the capital inside the restaurant. He also uses his power in attempts to get the hand of both Shinobu and Hermina, the latter getting her marriage annulled. It was thanks to Gernot, that he was able to expose Bachschouf for his crimes.

 Played by: Houka Kinoshita
 A Baron and self-professed foodie. He pesters Nobu at first, but after being served his favourite meal, humbly takes his leave. He later returns, helping to discover evidence against Bachschouf behind the scenes and saving Nobu.

Played by: Makoto Shinada
 A nobleman who adopted Hildegard after the death of his older brother and sister-in-law.

Played by: Kana Hayama
Hildegard is Johan Gustav's niece, who was adopted by her uncle after the death of her parents. Despite her age, she is soon to be married. She used to be a picky eater with a weak stomach, due to the fact that she only ended up tasting cold dishes, after her servants tested for food poisoning as always. After she eats a warm and heartfelt meal at Nobu, she feels satisfied with the great hospitality of the restaurant.

Johan's uncle and Hildegard's granduncle. It was thanks to him that after his personal dining experience in Nobu, he was able to repeal the ban of lager; as well as deal with the conflicts in the Northern Area.

Townspeople

Played by: Zen Kajihara
A servant who works for Bachschouf and previously worked for Baron Branton before being fired. During his employment under Branton, he tries to use his employer's name and authority to pressure Nobu into renting out the entire restaurant for the day, after which he is fired and finds new work under Bachschouf. He later tries to harass and usurp Nobu once more after Shinobu kicked him out for mistreating her and the business. In the anime version, Damian is exiled from Aitheria after Bachschouf's arrest. In the manga version, however, he flees from the back door of Nobu after his failed attempt at the witch hunt along with Archbishop Rodrigo, and gets trapped by Byakko's alternate dimension shrine gates. Later, he gets arrested by guards, along with his entire properties confiscated, until he later gets amnesty from the wedding of Emperor Conrad V, and ultimately wanders and becomes a drunkard in the United Kingdom.

Played by: Kazuki Namioka
The Aiteria tax collector, who is known for being quite ruthless. When attempting to collect taxes from Nobu (which he can't as its not actually part of his domain), Shinobu serves him Napolitan, a pasta dish that is not on the menu; it was this dish that made him lenient on Nobu; as the dish reminded him of his childhood. Because Napolitan was not on the menu, Shinobu had to make the dish for Gernot behind Nobuyuki's back until he found out; to which the dish is now a special item for Gernot. When Bachschouf attempted to take Nobu, Gernot did everything in his power to find evidence to clear the bar's name; which he did and at the same time catch Bachschouf in his corruption.
Due to a misunderstanding regarding a certain handkerchief in Eva's possession after the former emperor visited Nobu, Gernot came to the misassumption that Eva was the former emperor's granddaughter, and one of the reasons why the ban on lager was lifted. After coming to this wrongful conclusion, he wouldn't hear anything else and decided to take the "secret" with him to his grave.
 
 (Carmi)
 (Ignaz)
Soon to be brother-in-laws, who tend to make wacky bets with each other; whether it be Carmi trying different types of raw fish or Ignaz dressing as a woman in attempts to fool the customers and staff of Nobu. Ignaz refers Carmi as "Carmi the Coward" due to his personality.

The old capital's local butcher. He's responsible for providing Nobu with his daily wholesale supplies of fresh meats and other wild games.

The Holy Order

Played by: Ryosei Tayama
The town's newly appointed deacon from the Holy Order, who took a liking to Nobu's alcohol. He also provides the Cardinal's approval letter to Berthold and Hermina for their marriage to prevent it from being annulled by Bachschouf. At "Nobu", his favourite foods are Shiokara, Shutō, Horse Mackerel, and other dishes suitable for drinking.

A young priest, as well as the superior and former student of Deacon Edwin. When Edwin is summoned, he chooses Thomas as his temporary replacement, while he has gone. The two discuss rumors about a witch search among the Holy Order. Besides his works as a priest, he also focus upon astrology as well. Although he's quite a disciplinarian, and unwilling to drink alcohol, he could actually become drunk at the first few sips. At "Nobu", his favourite foods are eggplants and Scomber.

Others

She is God's Messenger, who serves under Ukanomitama. She takes the form of either a mikobeing of the Nobu shop from time to time. The only one who knows about her identity is Eva; after she chased her, in her fox form, through the magical door into Japan. In the anime, she has visited the bar and made contact with Nobuyuki and Shinobu in her human form, but remained silent around them, not revealing her identity; usually, giving a tip of Japanese yen instead of the Aitheria currency.

An Otogishu, a spy who was sent from the Eastern Kingdom of Oilia. He stumbled upon Nobu to gather intel; there Shinobu served him sample salads. Edwin seemed to already know his identity. After gathering intel from Shinobu and Nobu, he realized that Aitheria was too strong of a country; not realizing Nobu came from another world, where resources are abundant. Because of the place he rented during his mission, it's prevented Berthold and Herminia from moving in after their wedding, despite Berthold already buying the home.

Played by: Seina Sagiri
A female knight from the Eastern Kingdom of Oilia, who fought Berthold. She wears the armor with the squid emblem, which causes Berthold to relive his fear of squid. In turn, she refers to Berthold as The Demon after defeating many of her soldiers. Berthold managed to defeat her, but spared her life. Since then, she looked for Berthold to be his wife; using an Encounter Amulet to try and find him. After the war, she became a mercenary and escort which include The Witches of Brantano Forest, whom she provided an Encounter Amulet to Ingrid. When encountering Nikolaus, he determined that she was a mercenary, then directed her to Nobu after asking about any good places in Aitheria. She becomes friendly with Hermina after learning they're both from fishing villages; however, she eventually learns from Nobuyuki and Shinobu that Berthold is already married to Hermina. Since she's escorted the cardinal, she returns to the ancient capital once again. After completing her mission, she's replaced Hermina as an employee of "Nobu" temporarily, who's on her maternal leave.
 
The so-called witches who appear during the Night of the Dual Moons are actually a medical doctor, Ingrid, and her disciple, Camila. The duo live in Brantano Forest because of how isolated it is. Despite Ingrid's age, she has a childish personality, usually craving things like sweets and alcohol; while her disciple, Camilla, has a serious demeanor; usually reprimanding her for it. Camila also hates being treated like a kid. Despite being both a doctor and a pharmacist, Ingrid does practice magic as a hobby and is able to detect the magic emitting from "Nobu". Camilla gets upset about Ingrid's hobby due to it causing the townspeople to fear them. On top of that, Ingrid always gets drunk at "Nobu" first thing during the broad daylight, which upsets Camilla even further. At "Nobu", Ingrid's favourite foods are Pudding and Beni shōga (Red Pickled Ginger), and can accept Sashimi there (although she dislikes meat), while Camilla's favourite foods are Onigiri and Sashimi.

Media

Light novels

Manga
A manga adaptation with art by Virginia Nitōhei began serialization in Kadokawa Shoten's seinen manga magazine Young Ace from July 2015. It's been collected in 16 Japanese tankōbon volumes as of December 28, 2022. Ten of them have been translated into English Language Version. Udon Entertainment previewed volume 1 on March 29, 2018 with the cover for the September 2018 release.

Anime
An anime adaptation of the light novel series was announced in November 2016. The original net animation (ONA) is produced by Sunrise under the title  and it premiered worldwide simultaneously on April 13, 2018, on different streaming services. Katsumi Ono directed the anime with scripts written by Shin Yoshida and character designs by Mariko Ito. The ending theme is "Prosit!" by musical trio Clammbon. Crunchyroll is streaming the series.

Drama
A drama adaptation started airing on WOWOW in May 2020.
Season two will begin broadcasting on June 3, 2022 with another ten episodes.

Notes

References

External links
  
  
  
  
  
  

2018 anime ONAs
2014 Japanese novels
Anime and manga based on light novels
Cooking in anime and manga
Crunchyroll anime
Isekai anime and manga
Isekai novels and light novels
Kadokawa Shoten manga
Kono Light Novel ga Sugoi! Bunko
Light novels
Light novels first published online
Seinen manga
Shōsetsuka ni Narō
Sunrise (company)